"Guapa" (English: "Pretty") is a Latin pop song co-written and performed by the Argentine pop singer-songwriter Diego Torres and released on February 15, 2010, as the first single from his seventh studio album.

Song information
The song is co-written by former Sin Bandera, Noel Schajris and Luís Cardoso, and produced by himself and Rafael Arcaute. The song managed to provide Diego with a number-ten chart entry on the Billboard Top Latin Songs which peaked at number one, becoming on his first number one single on the chart, also is charted at number one on the Latin Pop Songs, making his second number one on this chart after "Se Que Ya No Volverás" in 1997.

Music video

The music video was filmed in Argentina in February 2010 and was directed by Jorge Caterbona with whom Diego has worked in other videos. In the video, Diego is accompanied by a guardian angel in his daily life. The video features Ricardo Darín who narrates the voice of the angel, Andrea Prieta as his wife and Federico D’Elia as his strict boss.

Track listing

Charts and sales

Weekly charts

Year-end charts

Certifications

References

External links
"Guapa" music video at YouTube
Diego Torres official website

2010 singles
Diego Torres songs
Songs written by Noel Schajris
2010 songs
Songs written by Diego Torres
Universal Records singles